The 2022–23 St. Thomas Tommies men's basketball team represented the University of St. Thomas in the 2022–23 NCAA Division I men's basketball season. The Tommies, led by 12th-year head coach John Tauer, played their home games at Schoenecker Arena in St. Paul, Minnesota as members of the Summit League.

This season marked St. Thomas's second year of a five-year transition period from Division III to Division I, an incredibly rare and historic jump that bypasses Division II altogether. As a result, the Tommies are not eligible for NCAA postseason play until 2026–27. The Tommies participated in their first ever Division I conference tournament, as the Summit League announced the 2023 Summit League men's basketball tournament will include all 10 conference teams.

Previous season
The Tommies finished the 2021–22 season 10–20, 4–14 in Summit League play to finish in a tie for eighth place. Because the Tommies were in the first year of a five-year transition period from DIII to DI, they were not eligible for NCAA postseason play, including the Summit League tournament.

Roster

Schedule and results

|-
!colspan=12 style=| Non-conference regular season

|-
!colspan=12 style=| Summit League regular season

|-
!colspan=12 style=|Summit League tournament

Sources

References

St. Thomas (Minnesota) Tommies men's basketball seasons
St. Thomas
St. Thomas (Minnesota) Tommies men's basketball
St. Thomas (Minnesota) Tommies men's basketball